This bibliography of Abul Hasan Ali Hasani Nadwi is a selected list of generally available scholarly resources related to Abul Hasan Ali Hasani Nadwi, a leading Islamic scholar, philosopher, writer, preacher, reformer and a Muslim public intellectual of 20th century India, the author of numerous books on history, biography, contemporary Islam and the Muslim community in India. He wrote a 7 volume autobiography in Urdu titled Karwan-e-Zindagi in 1983–1999. In this work, he tried to cover all the information related to himself as well as the remarkable events of his life. This list will include his biographies, theses written on him and articles published about him in various journals, newspapers, encyclopedias, seminars, websites etc. in APA style.

Encyclopedias

Biographies

Theses

Journals

Newspapers

Seminars

Websites

Other

Theses

Books

Journals

References

External links 
 PDF books on Abul Hasan Ali Hasani Nadwi

Abul Hasan Ali Hasani Nadwi
Islam-related lists
Bibliographies of people
Indian biographies
Deobandi-related bibliographies
Lists of books